The siege of Pest (modern city of Budapest, Hungary) occurred in 1542, when Ferdinand I attempted to recover the cities of Buda and Pest in 1542 from the Ottoman Empire. They had been occupied by the Ottomans under Suleiman since the siege of Buda (1541).

The siege was led by Joachim of Brandenburg. The siege was repulsed by the Ottomans, who would remain in control of central Hungary for the following 150 years.

Notes

1542 in Europe
Pest
Pest
History of Budapest
Ottoman period in Hungary
1542 in the Ottoman Empire